Aleksei Vitalyevich Mamin (born 22 March 1999) is a Russian football player. He plays for FC KAMAZ Naberezhnye Chelny on loan from FC Ural Yekaterinburg.

Club career
He was raised in FC Ural Yekaterinburg youth system and was first called up to the senior squad in December 2019.

On 17 June 2020, he joined FC KAMAZ Naberezhnye Chelny on loan for the 2020–21 season. He started 23 games for KAMAZ and helped the club achieve promotion to the second-tier Russian Football National League. On 2 July 2021, he returned to KAMAZ on another loan.

He made his debut in the Russian Football National League for KAMAZ on 23 July 2021 in a game against FC Olimp-Dolgoprudny.

On 8 July 2022, Mamin returned to KAMAZ for a third loan.

Personal life
His older brother Artyom Mamin is also a football player.

References

External links
 
 
 Profile by Russian Football National League

1999 births
Sportspeople from Yekaterinburg
Living people
Russian footballers
Association football goalkeepers
FC Ural Yekaterinburg players
FC KAMAZ Naberezhnye Chelny players
Russian First League players
Russian Second League players